An ushnu or usnu is a pyramid-shaped, terraced structure that was used by the Inca to preside at the most important ceremonies of the Tawantinsuyu, or Inca Empire.

Name 
Little is known of the Quechua root of the term ushnu, but it seemed to mean "the place of stones where the water filters". Presenting the places with characteristics of ushnu, major feasibility for the receipt of liquid offerings. They were probably used by the pre-Hispanic populations, when they had to conduct rituals in which they offered liquids, principally alcoholic maize drink, in sacrifice. Thus, a ceremonial concept formed of ushnu, that probably was referring to "the place where one offers liquids, or place of drinks ".

Structure 
The structure is a rectangular pyramid formed by five platforms, successively built to the highest part for a perron. Everything was constructed in stone. At the top was a double armchair worked in stone, which according to the local tradition was covered with golden sheets. This was the place where the Inca and the Coya (his wife) sat to give justice and to preside at the ceremonies and rituals that were developing in the square. In the peripheral Ushnu mas, his structure was enough a precarious mas, but it was arranged under archeoastronómics rules.

It is necessary to highlight the references of certain ethnohistórics documents that indicate that they were constructed in squares and inside the road network Inka, mentioning also the offerings alcoholic maize drinks in ceremonies, as the Capac Hucha2. But especially that treats itself about places of sacrifice and drink.

The references on the physical characteristics of the ushnus in the empire Inka have been described in Zuidema's investigations, Hyslop And Raffino et to. And particularly in the central zone of the Chinchaysuyu, in Wanuku Pampa for Shea, Morris and Thompson. In Taparaku for Serrudo. In Pumpu and Chakamarca for Matos  and Matos et to. In 1996.

Planning, radial organization and astronomic alignments 
In Cusco, the ushnu went ademàs a place destined to realize astronomic observations. This way Zuidema's investigations demonstrate it, The one who in addition mentions that " The ushnu was the architectural center of the square of the Cuzco and together with the Temple of the Sol it influenced the outline of the long shot of the city ". By what the overlapping function is perceived in the ushnu, with relation to the astronomy and to the design of the Imperial Capital.

The organization of the space that existed in the Cuzco was based on the system of ceques, Whose center was the Qurikancha. Some huacas of the ceques served as reference to astronomic observations done from the ushnu (Zuidema 1974/76, 1981). Being several huacas and ceques associated with astronomic specific phenomena (Zuidema 1974/76). Therefore, it departs from the organization of this system it would be of radial and astronomic order.

The model is divided by four cardinal basic directions in four quadrants (NE, SE, NW, SW), each one by four astronomic directions, having in whole 20 directions used for the planning in the tampus of the Chinchaysuyu.

World view and urbanism 
These ushnus were constructed in order to be understood according to the image that the Inkas wanted to project.The world was turning out to be composed by three planes, Hanan Pacha (the world of above), Kay Pacha (the world of here) and Uku Pacha or the world of the dead men and also of that one who was under the terrestrial surface.

In Quechua language, pasha means simultaneously time and space.

In an efficient way, on having been tied in a sense to his astral deities, and to be the point of connection between the worlds of below (Uku Pacha) and of the surface who were living (Kay Pacha), they fulfill the function to reveal the knowledge of the Pasha as time and space; representing in joint form, at the moment of realizing the ceremonies, a species of " Theatricality of the Power ", where the Inka or the representative of the Inka occupies the central position on the point that connects all the sacred directions, not only of three-dimensional form but concibiendo simultaneously, inside this abstraction, the temporary dimension. Being the artifice of the ushnu and the organization of elaborated spaces of form combines, they create a scene, in order to produce a collective uniform conscience. On having used ideas that existed in the conquered territories, and to use them to legitimize his position of Empire, they were assuring also the ideological domination. Being these tampus creations of New Cuzcos that: " they Can be compared in many senses with an enormous scene to being used by the condition for the integration of an interior fragmented area ", since Morris proposes it.

There is perceived also a zeal to connect symbolically the sacred sites of the territories in conquest by means of the Qapaq Ucha, to the sacred sites that they are creating, that are not only Huacas for yes same as the conquered ones, but the ushnus are connected to the whole cosmos.

The Capac Hucha was possibly the biggest of the ceremonies realized in the Empire Inca. It has been described for Duviols (1976) and Zuidema (1989).

Evolution 
The rituals became progressively more complex and the ushnu in the epoch Inka not only would be the place destined for liquid offerings, but also it would link itself with children's sacrifices, animals, as well as with the burning of fabrics and other offerings.

Bibliography

References

External links

Aymara mythology
Inca Empire
Indigenous culture of the Andes
Pre-Columbian architecture